Mancho Buttress (‘Rid Mancho’ \'rid 'man-cho\) is the ice-covered buttress rising to 1386 m on the northeast side of Detroit Plateau on Trinity Peninsula in Graham Land, Antarctica.  It has precipitous and partly ice-free southwest slopes, and surmounts Aitkenhead Glacier to the southwest and south.

The feature is named after Mancho Peak in Rila Mountain, Southwestern Bulgaria.

Location
German-British mapping in 1996.

Maps
 Trinity Peninsula. Scale 1:250000 topographic map No. 5697. Institut für Angewandte Geodäsie and British Antarctic Survey, 1996.
 Antarctic Digital Database (ADD). Scale 1:250000 topographic map of Antarctica. Scientific Committee on Antarctic Research (SCAR). Since 1993, regularly updated.

Notes

References
 Mancho Buttress. SCAR Composite Antarctic Gazetteer
 Bulgarian Antarctic Gazetteer. Antarctic Place-names Commission. (details in Bulgarian, basic data in English)

External links
 Mancho Buttress. Copernix satellite image

Mountains of Trinity Peninsula
Bulgaria and the Antarctic